Randolph Greenfield Adams (November 7, 1892 – January 4, 1951) was an American librarian and historian, director of the William L. Clements Library at the University of Michigan in Ann Arbor, Michigan, for 28 years.

Background
Adams was born in Philadelphia to John Stokes Adams, a lawyer and writer, and Heloise Zelina Root Adams. Adams later wrote "My father was the son of a Kentucky judge who married a Philadelphia Quaker; my mother was the daughter of a Connecticut Puritan who married a girl who was mostly French. (It would take a psychologist to make anything of that.)"

Academic career
Adams attended the Episcopal Academy and the University of Pennsylvania, where he graduated Phi Beta Kappa in 1914. As an undergraduate, he was moderator of the Philomathean Society and oversaw the publication of A History of the Philomathean Society of the University of Pennsylvania (1913). He spent that summer in Europe and was in Berlin at the outbreak of World War I and repatriated via the Netherlands. After initially studying law there, he became an assistant in history at the University of Pennsylvania in 1915 and a fellow in history at the University of Chicago in 1916. His academic career was briefly interrupted by serving in the United States Army. On June 7, 1917, he enlisted as a private and ten days later married Helen Newbold Spiller. After serving at a base hospital in France with the University of Pennsylvania unit, he was commissioned as a second lieutenant in the Quartermaster Corps and discharged in 1919. He then became a Carnegie Fellow in international law at the University of Pennsylvania and earned his Ph.D. in history in 1920. His doctoral dissertation, Political Ideas of the American Revolution, was published in 1922. Adams was a mentor to Howard Henry Peckham who helped him organize the library and who later became an accomplished historian involved in groundbreaking research in the American Revolution.

Adams spent the next three years as assistant professor of history at Trinity College. At the recommendation of librarian George Parker Winship, head of the Widener Library at Harvard University, Adams was interviewed by William L. Clements for the post of the director of the new library he was founding, the William L. Clements Library, a rare book and manuscript repository at the University of Michigan. Though he had no background or training as a librarian, his extensive historical knowledge and scholarship was coupled with a background in rare books, sparked in childhood by the collector A. Edward Newton, a friend of John Stokes Adams.

In 1923, Adams was appointed director of the Clements Library and professor of history at the University of Michigan, positions he held until his death in 1951. Initially, the Library consisted of the personal collection of Clements, thousands of rare books, newspapers, maps, and manuscripts, including the papers of General Thomas Gage, Sir Henry Clinton, Lord George Germain, William Petty, Lord Shelburne, General Freiherr von Jungkenn, and Nathanial Greene. Adams expanded the holdings of the library with significant acquisitions like the 1663 Eliot Indian Bible and The Valley of the Mississippi Illustrated by John Caspar Wild and Lewis Foulk Thomas. During Adams' tenure, the Clements Library became a preeminent repository and research institution.

Adams' views often ran contrary to trends developing in the library profession. While librarians promoted expanded access for patrons to materials, he turned away people seeking access to the Clements Library holdings if he judged their needs inadequate. In his controversial 1937 Library Quarterly essay, "Librarians as Enemies of Books", he complained about librarians de-emphasizing books and scholarship in favor of other responsibilities.

Adams' published scholarship includes A History of the Foreign Policy of the United States (1924), a textbook, Gateway to American History (1927) and Pilgrims, Indians and Patriots (1928), two works for a juvenile audience, and Three Americanists: Henry Harrisse, Bibliographer; George Brinley, Book Collector; Thomas Jefferson, Librarian (1939), a collection of his A. S. W. Rosenbach Lectures in Bibliography. He edited Selected Political Essays of James Wilson (1930) and contributed numerous entries to the Dictionary of American Biography and the Dictionary of American History, and served as editor of The Colophon and Quarto, the latter a publication of the Clements Library.

Adams was known as a workaholic and avoided sports and entertainment, once saying "Contract bridge is the idiot's substitute for research."  He died of heart disease in Ann Arbor, Michigan in 1951 and was interred at West Laurel Hill Cemetery in Bala Cynwyd, Pennsylvania.

References

Sources

External links
 "Librarians as Enemies of Books"

1892 births
1951 deaths
American librarians
20th-century American historians
American male non-fiction writers
Burials at West Laurel Hill Cemetery
Duke University faculty
University of Pennsylvania alumni
University of Michigan faculty
Writers from Michigan
Writers from Philadelphia
Historians from Pennsylvania
20th-century American male writers
American people of English descent
American people of French descent
United States Army personnel of World War I
United States Army officers